Mario Ferrari (September 3, 1894 – June 28, 1974) was an Italian film actor. After making his debut in 1920, Ferrari became a mainstay of Italian cinema during the Fascist era appearing in a mixture of leading and supporting roles. He played the villainous Graiano d'Asti in the historical film Ettore Fieramosca (1938). Ferrari continued to work regularly in the post-Second World War years.

Selected filmography

 Il milione (1920)
 Il rosso e il nero (1920)
 Castello dalle cinquantasette lampade (1920)
 L'isola scomparsa (1921)
 Palio (1932) - Bachicche
 The Table of the Poor (1932) - Attorney Volterra
 Your Money or Your Life (1932)
 1860 (1933) - Colonel Carini
 Villafranca (1934)
 L'impiegata di papà (1934) - Capoufficio
 La maestrina (1934) - Giacomo Macchia
 Everybody's Woman (1934) - Il produttore cinamatografico
 La città dell'amore (1934)
 Red Passport (1935) - Don Pablo Ramirez
 Lorenzino de' Medici (1935) - Ser Maurizio
 A Woman Between Two Worlds (1936) - Il dottor Lawburn
 Cavalry (1936) - Alberto Ponza
 The Anonymous Roylott (1936)
 King of Diamonds (1936) - Conte Fabrizio di Grottaferrata
 Condottieri (1937) - Cesare Borgia
 Queen of the Scala (1937) - Candido Ponti
 Marcella (1937)
 But It's Nothing Serious (1937)
 The Count of Brechard (1938) - Socrate
 Luciano Serra, Pilot (1938) - Il colonnello Franco Morelli
 Pride (1938) - Il banchiere castoldi
 Ettore Fieramosca (1938) - Graiano d'Asti
 The Knight of San Marco (1939) - Daniele Orsenigo
 No Man's Land (1939) - Pietro Gori
 Traversata nera (1939) - Bruce Brook, il commissario di bordo
 Cardinal Messias (1939) - Abuna Atanasio
 The Thrill of the Skies (1940) - L'aviatore
 L'uomo della legione (1940) - Mario Ristorni
 La última falla (1940) - Juan José
 The Sinner (1940) - Nino Bandelli, fratello di Pietro
 Piccolo alpino (1940) - Il capitano Lupo
 Il cavaliere senza nome (1941) - L'ambasciatore di Genova
 Il vetturale del San Gottardo (1941) - Favre
 Divieto di sosta (1941)
 Giungla (1942) - Il professore Foster
 Giarabub (1942) - Il capitano Del Grande
 Redemption (1943) - Il segretario del fascio
 Tempesta sul golfo (1943) - Generale Nunziante
 Men of the Mountain (1943) - Il capitano Piero Sandri
 La storia di una capinera (1943) - Il padre di Maria
 All'ombra della gloria (1945) - Il commissario della polizia borbonica
 The Ten Commandments (1945)
 La carne e l'anima (1947) - Mattia, il padre di Katrin
 Life of Donizetti (1947) - Il feldmaresciallo von Wallenburg
 Vanity (1947)
 The White Devil (1947) - Prof. Ilya
 Il principe ribelle (1947)
 I cavalieri dalle maschere nere (1948) - Conte Raimondo de la Motte
 Anthony of Padua (1949) - Il giudice Don Alicante
 Flying Squadron (1949) - Gen. Artesi
 Torment (1950) - L'avvocato Bianchi
 Women Without Names (1950) - Captain / Camp Commander
 Cavalcade of Heroes (1950) - Generale Odivot
 The Lion of Amalfi (1950)
 Feathers in the Wind (1950) - Frassoni
 Strano appuntamento (1950)
 The Black Captain (1951) - Duca Fabrizzio Di Corvara
 Verginità (1951)
 Senza bandiera (1951)
 Falsehood (1952) - Il padre di Mariella
 The Queen of Sheba (1952) - Chaldis, High Priest of Sheba
 Who Is Without Sin (1952) - John Morresi
 Brothers of Italy (1952) - Comandante nave italiana
 Storms (1953) - Il prefetto
 Noi peccatori (1953) - L'avvocato Rinaldi
 Lulu (1953) - Mister Franchi
 Madonna delle rose (1953) - Commissario
 The Pagans (1953) - Bishop Ghiberti
 Verdi, the King of Melody (1953) - Ufficiale Austriaco (uncredited)
 Il conte Aquila (1955) - Vitaliano Confalonieri
 The Angel of the Alps (1957) - conte Roverbella
 Goliath and the Dragon (1960, screenplay)
 The Avenger (1962) - Latino - King of Latium
 Me, Me, Me... and the Others (1966)

References

Bibliography
 Landy, Marcia. The Folklore of Consensus: Theatricality in the Italian Cinema, 1930-1943. SUNY Press, 1998.

External links

1894 births
1974 deaths
Italian male film actors
Italian male silent film actors
Male actors from Rome
20th-century Italian male actors